The Nogat is a 62 km long delta branch of the Vistula River in northern Poland. Unlike the main river, it does not empty into Gdańsk Bay but rather into the Vistula Lagoon.

The Nogat has its origin near the village of Biała Góra as a distributary of the Vistula River. Shortly after the river Liwa flows into the Nogat. Then the river passes Malbork and flows north-east towards Elbląg (but does not reach the city). North-west of Elbląg the Nogat flows into the south-western part of the Vistula Lagoon.

The river was located within the Kingdom of Poland until the First Partition of Poland in 1772, when it was annexed by Prussia, and from 1871 it was also part of Germany. During the interwar period, the Nogat formed the boundary between Germany and the Free City of Danzig (Gdańsk). It became again part of Poland following Germany's defeat in World War II in 1945.

References 

0Nogat
Rivers of Poland
Rivers of Pomeranian Voivodeship
Rivers of Warmian-Masurian Voivodeship